Mullaghmeen, at , is the county top for Westmeath in Ireland, and is the lowest county top in Ireland.  Mullaghmeen is located in the Mullaghmeen Forest, known for having the largest planted beech forest in Europe.

Geography 

Mullaghmeen lies in the northern tip of County Westmeath, just inside the border with County Meath, and looks into the northern Lough Sheelin, which forms the border with County Cavan.  The hill is 16 km north of the town of Castlepollard. At , the summit of Mullaghmeen is the highest point in County Westmeath, however, it is the lowest county top in Ireland.  The soil of Mullaghmeen is limestone, and in 1936 the Department of Agriculture decided it would be suited to the planting of deciduous trees, and created the 400 ha Mullaghmeen Forest, the largest planted beech forest in Europe.

Hill walking 

Mullaghmeen is described as a difficult mountain to find, and while its summit is of modest height, it is well-regarded as part of one of the several 2–3 hour circa 6 mile forest loop-walks through the Mullaghmeen Forest.  Most start at the car-park just beyond the entrance to Mullaghmeen Forest (at ) and take in the summit of Mullaghmeen as well as other landmarks, such as the Booley Hut, the Famine Garden, the Flax Pits, and the Woodland Arboretum.

See also

Lists of mountains in Ireland
List of Irish counties by highest point
List of mountains of the British Isles by height

References

External links
MountainViews: The Irish Mountain Website Mullaghmeen 
MountainViews: Irish Online Mountain Database
The Database of British and Irish Hills , the largest database of British Isles mountains ("DoBIH")
Hill Bagging UK & Ireland, the searchable interface for the DoBIH
Ordnance Survey Ireland ("OSI") Online Map Viewer
Logainm: Placenames Database of Ireland

Mountains and hills of County Westmeath
Highest points of Irish counties